KJJR (880 AM, "News Talk 880") is a radio station licensed to serve Whitefish, Montana.  The station is owned by Bee Broadcasting, Inc.  It airs a news/talk format.

Programming on KJJR includes syndicated talk shows hosted by Dan Bongino, Sean Hannity, Mark Levin, Michael Savage, Ben Shapiro, Joe Pags,  and Bill Cunningham.

All Bee Broadcasting stations are based at 2431 Highway 2 East, Kalispell, Montana.
The station was assigned the KJJR call letters by the Federal Communications Commission. 880 AM is a United States clear-channel frequency on which WCBS in New York, New York is the dominant and only Class A station.

References

External links
FCC History Cards for KJJR 
KJJR official website

JJR
News and talk radio stations in the United States
Radio stations established in 1980